Heart Like Your Own is the first studio album by Christian contemporary-praise & worship-pop rock singer Steve Hare, which the album was released on May 7, 2013 by Dream Records, and the producer on the album is Seth Mosley of Me in Motion.

Critical reception

Heart Like Your Own has received generally positive reception from music critics. At Christian Music Zine, Joshua Andre touched on how the album "surprised me (in a very good way)", and that he proclaimed to be "a brilliant debut!" David Bunce of CM Addict said that the "catchy melodies and heartfelt, meaningful lyrics of this album will reach many!" At Indie Vision Music, Jonathan Andre told that the album contains a "heartfelt message". Dawn Teresa of New Release Tuesday found that "with its solid set of songs, top-notch production, and passionate performances, Hare's Heart Like Your Own is no exception", and that she encouraged people to "go grab a copy, turn it up, and dance!"

Track listing

Chart performance

References

2013 debut albums